Letychiv Raion was one of the 20 administrative raions (a district) of Khmelnytskyi Oblast in western Ukraine. Its administrative center was located in the urban-type settlement of Letychiv. Its population was 34,588  as of the 2001 Ukrainian Census. The raion was abolished on 18 July 2020 as part of the administrative reform of Ukraine, which reduced the number of raions of Khmelnytskyi Oblast to three. The area of Letychiv Raion was merged into Khmelnytskyi Raion. The last estimate of the raion population was

Geography
Letychiv Raion was located in the eastern part of the Khmelnytskyi Oblast, corresponding to the modern-day boundaries of the Volhynia and Podolia historical regions. One of the main rivers that ran through the raion was the Southern Bug. To its east, it bordered upon Lityn Raion of Vinnytsia Oblast.

History
Letychiv Raion was established on March 7, 1923 as part of a full-scale administrative reorganization of the Ukrainian Soviet Socialist Republic. It was established along with Medzhybizh Raion, both of which compromise Letychiv Raion's current territorial boundaries.

In 1959, the raion's territory was expanded with the annexation of Derazhnia Raion, Stara Syniava Raion, and Medzhybizh Raios. In 1967, Derazhnia and Stara Syniava Raions were separated from the Letychiv Raion, leaving it with its current boundaries.

Subdivisions

At the time of disestablishment, the raion consisted of two hromadas:
 Letychiv settlement hromada with the administration in Letychiv;
 Medzhybizh settlement hromada with the administration in the urban-type settlement of Medzhybizh.

Letychiv Raion was divided in a way that follows the general administrative scheme in Ukraine. Local government was also organized along a similar scheme nationwide. Consequently, raions were subdivided into councils, which were the prime level of administrative division in the country.

Each of the raion's urban localities administered their own councils, often containing a few other villages within its jurisdiction. However, only a handful of rural localities were organized into councils, which also might contain a few villages within its jurisdiction.

Accordingly, the Letychiv Raion was divided into: 
 1 settlement council—made up of the urban-type settlement of Letychiv (administrative center) and Medzhybizh
 19 village councils

Overall, the raion had a total of 57 populated localities, consisting of two urban-type settlements, and 55 villages.

Places of interest
 Letychiv Fortress
 Medzhybizh Fortress

Notable residents 
 Zośka Vieras (1892, Medzhybizh village – 1991), Belarusian writer and one of the initiators and active participants of the Belarusian national revival

References

External links

 

Former raions of Khmelnytskyi Oblast
States and territories established in 1923
1923 establishments in Ukraine
Ukrainian raions abolished during the 2020 administrative reform